The 1992 United Nations Security Council election was held on 27 October 1992 during the Forty-seventh session of the United Nations General Assembly, held at United Nations Headquarters in New York City. The General Assembly elected Brazil, Djibouti (for the first time), New Zealand, Pakistan, and Spain, as the five new non-permanent members of the UN Security Council for two-year mandates commencing on 1 January 1993.

Rules
The Security Council has 15 seats, filled by five permanent members and ten non-permanent members. Each year, half of the non-permanent members are elected for two-year terms. A sitting member may not immediately run for re-election.

In accordance with the rules whereby the ten non-permanent UNSC seats rotate among the various regional blocs into which UN member states traditionally divide themselves for voting and representation purposes, the five available seats are allocated as follows:

One for African countries (held by Zimbabwe)
One for countries from the Asian Group (now the Asia-Pacific Group) (held by India)
One for Latin America and the Caribbean (held by Ecuador)
Two for the Western European and Others Group (held by Austria and Belgium)

To be elected, a candidate must receive a two-thirds majority of those present and voting. If the vote is inconclusive after the first round, three rounds of restricted voting shall take place, followed by three rounds of unrestricted voting, and so on, until a result has been obtained. In restricted voting, only official candidates may be voted on, while in unrestricted voting, any member of the given regional group, with the exception of current Council members, may be voted on.

Pre-election statements
Before the vote itself was held, the Chairmen of the regional groups made their statements endorsing the respective regional candidates. Mr. Ould Mohamed Mahmoud of Mauritania, speaking on behalf of the African Group, transferred the recommendation for the candidacy of Djibouti by both the African Group and the Organization of African Unity. Mr. Aksin of Turkey, speaking on behalf of the Asian Group, transferred the endorsement of the Group for the candidacy of Pakistan. Mr. Piriz Ballon of Uruguay transferred the endorsement of the Latin American and Caribbean Group for the candidacy of Brazil. Mr. Haakonsen of Denmark, speaking for the Western European and Others Group, announced the candidatures of New Zealand, Spain, and Sweden.

Results

African and Asian States

Latin American and Caribbean Group

Western European and Others Group

See also
List of members of the United Nations Security Council,
Brazil and the United Nations
New Zealand and the United Nations
Pakistan and the United Nations

References

External links
UN Document A/47/PV.48 Official record of General Assembly meeting, 11 November 1992

1992 elections
1992
Non-partisan elections
1992 in international relations